The Assessor is an official in the University of Oxford, in England. The position was created in 1960. The assessor is responsible for student welfare and serves for one year, beginning in March.

Notable assessors
Notable former assessors include:

 Michael Mingos (1991–92)
 John Landers (1994–95)
 Roger Goodman (1997-98)
 Angus M. Bowie (1998-99)
 Lawrence Goldman (2000–01)
 Patricia Daley (2015–16)
 William Allan (2018–19)

References

External links
1.2 The Proctors and the Assessor

1960 establishments in England
Ombudsman posts
Lists of people associated with the University of Oxford
Administrators of the University of Oxford